Al Dhafra FC is a professional football club based in Madinat Zayed, United Arab Emirates. As of the 2020–21 season they play in the UAE Arabian Gulf League. Their futsal club participated in AFC Futsal Club Championship.

History 
Al Dhafra FC was established in 2000, as part of a policy to promote sports across the country and the Al Dhafra region of Abu Dhabi had no team, so Al Dhafra is the first and only club to be located in the western region. For most of its history the club was classified as a semi-professional club according to the UAE Pro League committee and did not have licenses to compete in the AFC competitions but the team had continued to appeal for a license since qualifying for the UAE President's Cup for the first time in 2019. Around 2020 the club finally obtained their licenses, thus all pro league teams can compete in AFC competitions.

Current squad
As of UAE Pro-League:

Out on loan

{|
|-
| valign="top" |

Managers
 Mohammad Kwid (2008)
 Laurent Banide (2009)
 Baltemar Brito (2011)
 Džemal Hadžiabdić (2011–12)
 Laurent Banide (2012–13)
 Abdullah Mesfer (2013–14)
 Anel Karabeg (2014)
 Marin Ion (2014–15)
 Mohammad Kwid (2015–18)
 Gjoko Hadžievski (2018)
 Vuk Rašović (2018–2020)
 Aleksandar Veselinović (2020–2021)
 Mohammad Kwid (2021)
 Rogério Micale (2021–2022)
 Nebojša Vignjević (02.07.2022–31.10.2022)
 Aleksandar Veselinović (01.11.2022–)

Pro-League Record

Notes 2019–20 UAE football season was cancelled due to the COVID-19 pandemic in the United Arab Emirates.

Key
 Pos. = Position
 Tms. = Number of teams
 Lvl. = League

Honours
President's Cup: 
Runners-up (1): 2018–19
Finalist (1): 2019–20
 UAE First Division League: 2
Champions: 2001–02, 2006–07
 UAE Vice Presidents Cup: 1
Champions: 2012

References

External links
 Official site

Dhafra
Sport in the Emirate of Abu Dhabi
2000 establishments in the United Arab Emirates
Association football clubs established in 2000